Nemophora is a genus of the fairy longhorn moth family (Adelidae). Among these, it belongs to subfamily Adelinae.

Selected species

 Nemophora ahenea Stringer, 1930
 Nemophora albiciliellus (Staudinger, 1859)
 Nemophora amatella (Staudinger, 1892)
 Nemophora askoldella (Milliére, 1879)
 Nemophora assamensis Kozlov, 1997
 Nemophora associatella (Zeller, 1839)
 Nemophora augantha  (Meyrick 1907)
 Nemophora barbatellus Zeller, 1847
 Nemophora basella (Eversmann, 1844)
 Nemophora belella (Walker, 1863)
 Nemophora bifasciatella Issiki, 1930
 Nemophora cassiterites (Meyrick, 1907)
 Nemophora chionites (Meyrick, 1907)
 Nemophora chrysoprasias  (Meyrick 1907)
 Nemophora congruella (Zeller, 1839)
 Nemophora cupriacella (Hübner, 1819)
 Nemophora degeerella (Linnaeus, 1758)
 Nemophora divina (Caradja, 1939)
 Nemophora dumerilellus (Duponchel, 1839)
 Nemophora engraptes  (Meyrick, 1907)
 Nemophora fasciella (Fabricius, 1775)
 Nemophora griseella Walsingham, 1880
 Nemophora humilis (Walsingham, 1891)
 Nemophora ischnodesma (Meyrick)
 Nemophora istrianella (Heydenreich, 1851)
 Nemophora japonica Stringer, 1930
 Nemophora karafutonis (Matsumura, 1932)
 Nemophora lapikiella Kozlov, 1997
 Nemophora magnifica Kozlov, 1997
 Nemophora metallica (Poda, 1761)
 Nemophora minimella (Denis & Schiffermüller, 1775)
 Nemophora molella (Hübner, 1816)
 Nemophora ochsenheimerella (Hübner, 1813)
 Nemophora parvella (Walker, 1863)
 Nemophora pfeifferella (Hübner, 1813)
 Nemophora raddei (Rebel, 1901)
 Nemophora raddella (Hübner, 1793)
 Nemophora seraphias  (Meyrick, 1907)
 Nemophora staudingerella Christoph, 1881
 Nemophora stellata Hirowatari, 1995
 Nemophora sylvatica Hirowatari, 1995
 Nemophora umbripennis Stringer, 1930
 Nemophora violellus (Stainton, 1851)

References
 Mikhail V. Kozlov (2003): Annotated checklist of the European species of Nemophora (Adelidae) – Nota lepidopterologica – 26: 115–126.  pdf

External links

 Nemophora at funet

Adelidae
Adeloidea genera
Taxa named by Johann Karl Wilhelm Illiger
Taxa named by Johann Centurius Hoffmannsegg